Jitendra Lal Das popularly known as Junu Das was an Indian politician and a leader of the Communist Party of India. He was a member of the Tripura Legislative Assembly, representing the Belonia constituency from 1972 to 1977. He was one of the founder members of AISF. He was elected as Secretary of CPI Tripura State Council in the year 1972, the post which he held till his death in the year 1992.

References

Communist Party of India politicians from Tripura
Tripura MLAs 1972–1977